Loughborough Lightning may refer to one of three women's sports teams based at Loughborough University:

 Loughborough Lightning (netball)
 Loughborough Lightning (women's cricket) 
 Loughborough Lightning (women's rugby union)